Manne Island is an island of Papua New Guinea, located of the north-west coast of New Ireland. It is located east of Baudisson Island; Balgai Bay separates it from the town of Kavieng on the northern tip of New Ireland.

References

Islands of Papua New Guinea